Horpa (also known in some publications as Stau - Chinese: 道孚语 Daofu, 爾龔語 Ergong) are a cluster of closely related Gyalrongic languages of China. Horpa is better understood as a cluster of closely related yet unintelligible dialect groups/languages closely related to Horpa Shangzhai or Stodsde skad. The term Stodsde skad is a Tibetan name meaning "language of the upper village".

Names 
Ethnologue lists alternate names and dialect names for Horpa as Stau/Daofuhua, Bawang, Bopa, Danba, Dawu, Geshitsa/Geshiza/Geshizahua, Hor, Huo’er, Hórsók, Nyagrong-Minyag, Pawang, Rgu, Western Gyarong/Western Jiarong, Xinlong-Muya, and rTa’u.

Classification 
Horpa is a type of Gyalrongic language, a branch of  the Qiangic languages of the Sino-Tibetan family. Gyalrong (proper), Khroskyabs, and Horpa are in the Gyalrongic subgroup. From a genetic perspective, Horpa is a branch within West Gyalrongic, the other being Khroskyabs. Shangzhai is a sub-type of Horpa. To date, the Horpa languages are the closest attested ones to the medieval language Tangut.

Geographic distribution 
Horpa is spoken primarily in western Sichuan province, China, including in Dasang District, Danba County of Garzê Tibetan Autonomous Prefecture, Sichuan.  There are about 50,000 Horpa speakers in the northwestern Sichuan. It is also spoken in nearby Dawu County, where it is called 'Stau', pronounced [stawuske].Ergong is a non-tonal language (Sun 2013).

Varieties 
Varieties of Horpa include Shangzhai Horpa and Gexi Horpa (Sun 2013).

Jackson Sun (2018) lists the following five varieties of Horpa.
Central Horpa (Stau-Dgebshes) is widely spoken in Rta’u County (Daofu County 道孚县) and Rongbrag County (Danba County 丹巴县), Dkarmdzes Prefecture, as well as a few villages in western Chuchen County (Jinchuan County 金川县), Rngaba Prefecture. It consists of 3 dialects.
Rta’u (Daofu 道孚) (non-tonal). Also documented in Genxia Wengmu (2019).
Dgebshesrtsa (Geshezha 革什扎) (non-tonal)
Upper Stongdgu (Shang Donggu 上东谷) (has constrative phonation)
Northern Horpa (Stodsde) is spoken in southern Dzamthang County (Rangtang County 壤塘县), Rngaba Prefecture. It is the most conservative Horpa variety, and preserves many archaic morphological features. There are 3 mutually intelligible dialects. For this lect, Ethnologue lists the name sTodsde (Shangzhai 上寨, Western Jiarong). According to Ethnologue, sTodsde is spoken in Shangzhai district, southern Rangtang County, where it is spoken in the townships of Puxi, Shili, and Zongke townships, and around the Duke and Zhongke rivers' confluence. There are 4,100 speakers as of 2004. Dialects are Dayili (Northern), Zongke (宗科乡; Western), and Puxi (蒲西乡; Eastern). Phonologically, the Northern and Western dialects are similar to each other, while the Eastern dialect is divergent. Additionally, Gates (2010) considers Erkai to be a "Western rGyalrongic" (Horpa-Shangzhai) language. Jackson Sun classifies Erkai as a variety of sTodsde (Shangzhai).
Phosul (Puxi 蒲西)
Yunasche (Dayili 大依里)
Sili-Rtsangkhog (Shili-Zongke 石里-宗科)
Western Horpa is a tonal language scattered throughout several small areas of central and southern Nyagrong County (Xinlong County 新龙县), Dkarmdzes Prefecture. Although speakers refer to themselves as Minyag (mə̀ɲá, mə̀ ɲó, etc.), Western Horpa is not the same language as the Minyag or Muya language. There are 3 dialects that are significantly different from each other. The Nyagrong Minyag (Western Horpa) language has also been documented by Van Way (2018).
rGyarwagshis (Jialaxi 甲拉西)
Yangslagshis (Youlaxi 尤拉西)
Bangsmad (Bomei 博美)
Northwestern Horpa, an endangered Horpa variety, is spoken in southern Brag’go County (Luhuo County 炉霍县) and adjacent areas of Rta’u County (Daofu County 道孚县). There is heavy Tibetan influence and minor internal diversity. It is non-tonal.
Eastern Horpa is a divergent Horpa variety spoken in Dpa’bo (Bawang 巴旺) and Nyindkar (Niega 聂嘎) townships, eastern Rongbrag County (Danba County 丹巴县).

Phonology

Consonants 

 /q/ is heard as [ɢ] when following a nasal consonant.
 A glottal stop [ʔ] is also heard, but only when occurring before word-initial onset-less vowel syllables.
 /v/ can be heard as voiceless [f] when preceding or following voiceless consonants.
 /x/ can also be heard as glottal [h] in free variation among speakers.
 The uvular nasal [ɴ] is only heard when appearing together with uvular consonants /q/, /qʰ/ and [ɢ].

Rhotic consonant 
/r/ has four allophones as either retroflex voiceless [ʂ] or voiced [ʐ] fricatives, as a trill [r], or as a result of vowel rhotacization [V˞]. It is heard as [ʂ] when preceding or following voiceless consonants or also as a word-final coda. It is heard as [ʐ] when in free variation in initial position or when preceding or following voiced consonants. The occurrence of it as a trill [r] is heard word-medially when after a vowel and before a consonant, but is for the most part less predictable in that it overlaps in distribution with [ʂ] and especially [ʐ]. When words with /r/ are heard in isolation, the sound is heard as [ʐ], but then it becomes a trill [r] when in word context or within compounds. [r] also alternates with [ʂ] when it is in context word-final position. The rhotacization of vowels [V˞] occurs on the preceding vowel before /r/ in word-final position, however it can also be heard word-medially when before a lateral approximant /l/. The rhotacization is attested on the vowels /ɛ/, /ə/, /u/ and /ɑ/.

Vowels 

 /i/ is also heard as [ɪ], when in word-final position by a coda consonant.

Vocabulary 
The following comparative table of Horpa diagnostic vocabulary items is from Sun (2018:4). The Central Horpa (Rta’u) data is from Niwan Village, Dgebshes Township, Rta’u County (Daofu County), Sichuan. The Rgyalrongic languages Khroskyabs and Rgyalrong are also provided for comparison, since Horpa is one of the Rgyalrongic languages. Cognates are highlighted in bold.

Jacques et al. (2017) list the following words as lexical innovations shared by Stau and Khroskyabs (Lavrung), but not by the Core rGyalrong languages.

Grammar 
Shangzhai Horpa (Puxi Shangzhai) is a dialect of the Horpa language noted by a single consistently non-syllabic causative prefix "s-", which exerts pressure on the already elaborate onset system and triggers multiple phonological adjustments (Sun 2007). Gexi Horpa language not only has split verbal agreement system like rGyalrong but also has a hybrid system involving a more intricate interplay of functional and syntactic factors (Sun 2013). The verbs in the rGylarongic family are marked for person and agreement, and Horpa language also has subtype of hierarchical agreement.

Stau is often used as an alternative name for Horpa, but in fact Stau is just one of several Horpa languages (Jacques et al. 2014). The Stau language is primarily spoken in Daofu County of Ganzi Prefecture, but is also spoken in the southeastern corner of Luhuo County and in the village of Dangling of western Danba County. Currently Jesse P. Gates is writing a comprehensive grammar of the Stau language (Gates to appear). Other articles on aspects of Stau grammar include Gates (2017), Gates & Kim (2018), Gates et al. (2019), and Gates et al. (2022).

Stau (Horpa) language follows some traits of the Tibetan language (Bradley 2012). As a Qiangic language, Horpa has unique verb inflection and morphology such as the strategy of inverting the aspiration feature in the formation of the past and progressive stem(s) (Sun 2000).

Examples 
Verb agreement
The Horpa verb agrees with its subject. For example, zbəcʰa-i [zbəcʰe], means ‘you beat’, and zbəcʰa-u [zbəcʰo], means,  'I beat’.

References

External links 
Horpa at the Endangered Languages Project.

 http://glottolog.org/resource/languoid/id/horp1239

Qiangic languages
Languages of China